Calum James Angus (born 15 April 1986) is an English former professional footballer who played as a centre-back.

Career

Wilmington Hammerheads
Angus was invited to the 2009 MLS Player Combine in Florida for the 2009 MLS SuperDraft. Due to a strong college career, numerous pundits and journalists predicted him to go reasonably high in the draft, so it was a surprise when he went undrafted. Major League Soccer side New York Red Bulls offered him a trial, but he declined. However, soon after he signed with USL-2 side Wilmington Hammerheads FC, a team in the 3rd tier of American league soccer.

GAIS
In June 2009 he went on a trial with Swedish side GAIS and on 8 July the club confirmed signing of Angus. Angus made his debut for GAIS against Halmstad BK on 12 July 2009. He came off the bench in the 81st minute and scored the equalizer for GAIS in the 90th minute of the match. Angus spent time training with West Ham United at the end of the 2011 Allsvenskan season. GAIS finished in last place and were relegated from the 2012 Allsvenskan. After their relegation the club announced that four of the players who were under contract would be allowed to leave for free, Angus being one of them. As he was unable to find a new club during the winter transfer window he remained at GAIS for the first half of the 2013 Superettan season before eventually leaving at the end of July.

Pune
On 7 August 2013 it was announced that Angus had signed for Pune F.C. of the I-League. He made his debut for the club on 21 September 2013 in the league against Mohammedan S.C. at the Salt Lake Stadium. Then, on 19 October 2013, he scored his first goal for the club against Churchill Brothers in which he found the net in the 52nd minute to give Pune a 1–0 victory. He then scored his second goal of the season in the very next match against Rangdajied United F.C. in which his 29th-minute goal led Pune to another 1–0 victory.

Dempo
Last season, Angus signed for another Indian club Dempo SC.

East Bengal
On season 2016 Angus signed for another Indian club East Bengal FC. He played all the matches in Calcutta Football League where East Bengal won the trophy And also Played In The 2016 Bordoloi Trophy Where He won Best Player of the tournament award. He was released before the start of the I-League and East Bengal FC signed Uganda defensive midfielder Bukenya as his replacement.

Career statistics

References

External links 
 Calum Angus at Pune Football Club
 Calum Angus at USLsoccer.com
 
 

1986 births
Living people
Saint Louis Billikens men's soccer players
St. Louis Lions players
Wilmington Hammerheads FC players
English footballers
GAIS players
Pune FC players
Dempo SC players
East Bengal Club players
USL League Two players
USL Second Division players
Allsvenskan players
Superettan players
I-League players
Expatriate soccer players in the United States
Expatriate footballers in Sweden
Expatriate footballers in India
English expatriate footballers
English expatriate sportspeople in the United States
English expatriate sportspeople in Sweden
English expatriate sportspeople in India
Association football central defenders
All-American men's college soccer players